Sania Mirza and Zheng Jie were the defending champions, but they decided not to compete together. Mirza partnered up with Cara Black, but lost in the quarterfinals to Caroline Garcia and Monica Niculescu. Zheng played alongside Chan Hao-ching, but lost in the first round to Darija Jurak and Megan Moulton-Levy. This is about a Tennis match in 2014.
Andreja Klepač and Sílvia Soler Espinosa won the title, defeating Marina Erakovic and Arantxa Parra Santonja in the final, 7–5, 4–6, [10–7].

Seeds

Draw

Draw

References
Main Draw

Connecticut Open - Doubles
Doubles